The Taifa of Ceuta was one of the taifa states formed after the breakup of the Caliphate of Córdoba in the early 11th century. The cities of Ceuta and Tangiers were a part of the Ḥammūdid dynasty taifa of Málaga from 1026. From 1036 (427 AH) it was governed on behalf of the Ḥammūdids by the Barghawāṭa, a Berber tribe with a non-Islamic religion. Shortly before 1061 (453 AH), the Barghawāṭa, led by the illiterate Saqqūt, took power from the Ḥammūdids. They could field a large army of 12,000 cavalry, but were defeated and conquered by the rising power of the Almoravids in 1078–79.

Notes

Ceuta
History of Ceuta
11th century in Morocco
11th century in Al-Andalus
1037 establishments
Hammudid dynasty